East Asia Tonight was a long-running flagship weekday news programme on Channel NewsAsia that aired between 8:00pm and 8:30pm (Singapore/Hong Kong time), providing a round-up of all the day's events in China, Taiwan, Hong Kong, Japan, North and South Korea, coverage of breaking news and international news in brief, as well as news analyses from Channel NewsAsia correspondents around East Asia. The show was presented by Genevieve Woo. Since 2011, East Asia Tonight was combined with Southeast Asia Tonight to form Primetime Asia which in turn became Asia Tonight.

Mediacorp
Television news shows